American singer and songwriter Haley Reinhart has released 4 studio albums, 1 extended play, 15 singles (including 3 promotional and 2 featured singles), and has made 18 appearances as featured or guest vocalist, most notably for her role as a recurring performer with the jazz collective Postmodern Jukebox.

Reinhart's debut studio album, Listen Up! was released on May 22, 2012, following the release of the lead single "Free". The album debuted at number 17 on the Billboard 200 and has sold 77,000 units as of 2016. After being dropped by her label, Interscope at the end of 2012, Reinhart independently released the single "Show Me Your Moves" in 2014, with the help of crowdfunding website Indiegogo.

Her second studio album, Better followed in 2016, being released on April 29. It was funded with the help of ole Management Company, and red dot, who served as the publishers for this independent album release. The album debut at number 22 on the Independent Albums chart, selling approximately 7,500 units in its first two weeks of release. Better spawned the lead single, "Better", as well as Reinhart's most successful single release to date, a cover of the Elvis classic "Can't Help Falling in Love" which served as the first promotional single for the album. The single rose in popularity after being used in an Extra gum commercial that became a viral sensation online. The single has since peaked at number 16 on the US AC chart, selling approximately 250,000 units as of October 2016, and having been streamed more than 32,000,000 times on Spotify, making it her most streamed single through the streaming service.

Reinhart's third studio album, What's That Sound?, was released September 22, 2017 through Concord Records. The lead single "Baby It's You" was released June 16, 2017, followed by "For What It's Worth" on August 11, 2017 and "Let's Start" on September 19, 2017. "The Letter" was also released on July 13, 2017, as a promotional single.

Reinhart has also seen success on the Jazz Digital charts with her releases as part of Postmodern Jukebox. 6 of the 8 singles released with the band have charted in the top 20, including her most successful single, a remake of Radiohead's "Creep", which peaked at number 1 on the chart dated May 25, 2015, and has appeared on the chart for 58 consecutive weeks.

Reinhart was a featured collaborator on Irvin Mayfield and Kermit Ruffins's album A Beautiful World, released October 13, 2017. She sings on the track "Don't Worry, Be Happy" alongside Jason Marsalis, Cyril Neville, and Glen David Andrews, and the title track "Beautiful World [for Imani]". She also provides uncredited vocals on the song "Mystic", and backing vocals throughout the album.

Released songs

References 

Reinhart, Haley